Eyehategod is the fifth studio album by American sludge metal band Eyehategod. It was released on May 26, 2014 in North America through Housecore Records and on May 27, 2014 in Europe through Century Media Records.

Eyehategod is considered a posthumous album for late drummer Joe LaCaze who died in August 2013 due to respiratory failure and was replaced by Aaron Hill. It was also the last album to feature lead guitarist Brian Patton before his departure in 2018.

Songs from Eyehategod were performed live as early as 2011, when the album was rumored to be titled Whiskey Drink. A music video was made for the song "Medicine Noose".

Reception

Eyehategod received positive reviews from critics. On Metacritic, the album holds a score of 77/100 based on seven reviews, indicating "generally favorable reviews".

Track listing

Personnel
Eyehategod
Mike IX Williams – vocals
Brian Patton – lead guitar
Jimmy Bower – rhythm guitar
Gary Mader – bass
Joe LaCaze – drums

Production
Kevin Bernier – layout
Nathaniel Shannon – photography
Collin Jordan – mastering
Sanford Parker – mixing
Chris George – engineering
Billy Anderson – recording (drums)
Phil Anselmo – recording (vocals)
Stephen Berrigan – recording (vocals, bass, guitars)
Daniel Majorie – engineering

Chart positions

Release history

References

2014 albums
Eyehategod albums
Century Media Records albums